Puranattukara is a census town in Thrissur district in the Indian state of Kerala.

Demographics
 India census, Puranattukara had a population of 9595. Males constitute 48% of the population and females 52%. Puranattukara has an average literacy rate of 85%, higher than the national average of 59.5%: male literacy is 86%, and female literacy is 83%. In Puranattukara, 10% of the population is under 6 years of age.

Educational institutions
Puranattukara village is home to a number of educational institutions like the Rashtriya Sanskrit Sansthan, Kendriya Vidyalaya, Sri ramakrishna math school, Sri Sarada Girls Higher Secondary School.
Puranattukara is part of Adat Grama panjayat.

References

St. Sebastian's Church is the only catholic church in Puranattukara.
Main roads are Manidom Road, Marathaka Road.

Cities and towns in Thrissur district